there are more than 80 former places of worship on the Isle of Wight, England's largest island.  The diamond-shaped,  island, which lies in the English Channel and is separated from the county of Hampshire by The Solent, has a population of around 140,000 spread across several small towns and dozens of villages.  Many former churches and chapels survive in alternative uses in the ancient ports of Yarmouth and Newport, the Victorian seaside resorts of Ryde, Sandown, Shanklin and Ventnor, and the twin towns of Cowes and East Cowes; and in villages and hamlets across the island, Anglican parish churches and mission churches and Nonconformist chapels have fallen of use and have been converted into houses, holiday cottages, village halls and similar.

Fifteen former churches and chapels have been awarded listed status by Historic England or its predecessor organisations in recognition of their architectural and historical interest.  These include the ancient former churches in the villages of Bonchurch and St Lawrence, the ruined churches in St Helens and Thorley, former Methodist chapels in the towns of Cowes, Newport and Yarmouth, and an 18th-century malt house which briefly served as Niton's first Baptist chapel.   A building is defined as "listed" when it is placed on a statutory register of buildings of "special architectural or historic interest" in accordance with the Planning (Listed Buildings and Conservation Areas) Act 1990.  The Department for Digital, Culture, Media and Sport, a Government department, is responsible for listing; Historic England, a non-departmental public body, acts as an agency of the department to administer the process and advise the department on relevant issues.  There are three grades of listing status. Grade I, the highest, is defined as being of "exceptional interest"; Grade II* is used for "particularly important buildings of more than special interest"; and Grade II, the lowest, is used for buildings of "special interest".  As of February 2001, there were 26 Grade I-listed buildings, 55 with Grade II* status and 1,823 Grade II-listed buildings on the Isle of Wight.  A further six former churches, including four tin tabernacles, have locally listed status: they are considered by the Isle of Wight Council to be "locally important [in] contributing to the character and sense of place on the Island".  Such buildings must meet at least two of the following criteria: historic interest; architectural, artistic and design merit; survival; townscape merit; and archaeological interest.

Listed status

Former places of worship

Notes

References

Bibliography

 (Available online in 14 parts)

Isle of Wight, Former
Isle of Wight, Former
Former
Lists of buildings and structures on the Isle of Wight